Helianthus porteri is a species of sunflower known by the common names Porter's sunflower, Stone Mountain daisy and Confederate daisy. The term "daisy" is a imprecise because the species is a sunflower (Helianthus) rather than a daisy (Bellis and related genera). Likewise, although the plant grows on Stone Mountain, GA, its range extends well beyond. The connection to the Confederacy is through Stone Mountain which contains a confederate monument, although the connection is tenuous as the species was named before the Civil War in 1849 by Harvard botanist Asa Gray in honor of Thomas Conrad Porter, a Pennsylvanian minister and botanist who collected the plant in Georgia. Gray initially named the plant Rudbeckia porteri, changed to Helianthus in 1998 by John F. Pruski. The common name Porter's sunflower therefore most closely accords with the history of botanical discovery and naming.

The species is native to the southeastern United States, such as Alabama and Georgia, but has been introduced to granite outcrop areas in North Carolina where it is aggressively weedy.

Helianthus porteri grows on thin soils on and around flat rock granite and gneiss outcrops. It is an annual herb up to 100 cm (40 inches) tall. One plant usually produces 5 or more  flower heads, each containing 7 or 8 yellow ray florets surrounding 30 or more yellow disc florets.

References

External links

photo of herbarium specimen at Missouri Botanical Garden, collected in Georgia in 1846, isotype of Rudbeckia porteri/Viguiera porteri/Helianthus porteri
Scott D. Gevaert, Jennifer R. Mandel, John M. Burke, and Lisa A. Donovan. 2013. High Genetic Diversity and Low Population Structure in Porter’s Sunflower (Helianthus porteri). Journal of Heredity 2013:104(3):407–415 doi:10.1093/jhered/est009
Plant Life of the Monastery of the Holy Spirit by Jim Allison
Alabama Plant Atlas, Helianthus porteri

porteri
Flora of the Southeastern United States
Plants described in 1849
Flora without expected TNC conservation status